Tamás Ferenc Béres (born 15 April 1982) is a Hungarian football player who currently plays for Lombard-Pápa TFC.

References 
HLSZ
Lombard FC Papa Official Website

1982 births
Living people
Hungarian footballers
Association football forwards
FC Tatabánya players
Lombard-Pápa TFC footballers